Terrence McAllister (born May 11, 1984 in Arima) is a Trinidadian soccer player, currently without a club.

Career

Professional
McAllister began his professional career in Trinidad, playing with the successful Joe Public club from 2002 to 2008, winning the 2006 TT Pro League title and the 2007 Trinidad and Tobago Cup. He was in the Joe Public squad that defeated the New England Revolution in the CONCACAF Champions League in September 2008.

He joined the Cleveland City Stars in the USL First Division in 2009 after a successful trial.

International
McAllister has played for the Trinidad and Tobago national football team at U-17 and U-20 level. He made his debut for the full national team in January 2008 where he started in a 2-1 defeat of Guyana.

References

External links
 Cleveland City Stars bio

1984 births
Living people
Association football midfielders
Cleveland City Stars players
Joe Public F.C. players
People from Arima
Trinidad and Tobago expatriate footballers
Trinidad and Tobago footballers
Trinidad and Tobago international footballers
TT Pro League players
USL First Division players